The Bal'ami family was a Persian family native to Khorasan and Transoxiana. The most famous members were Abu'l-Fadl al-Bal'ami (d. 940) and his son
Muhammad Bal'ami (d. 974).

Although some sources state that they were of Arab origin, they were most likely of Persian origin, and was originally the mawla of the Tamim tribe. The family later claimed to be of noble Arab origin in order to raise their prestige.

Sources